

483001–483100 

|-bgcolor=#f2f2f2
| colspan=4 align=center | 
|}

483101–483200 

|-bgcolor=#f2f2f2
| colspan=4 align=center | 
|}

483201–483300 

|-bgcolor=#f2f2f2
| colspan=4 align=center | 
|}

483301–483400 

|-bgcolor=#f2f2f2
| colspan=4 align=center | 
|}

483401–483500 

|-id=454
| 483454 Hosszúkatinka ||  || Katinka Hosszú (born 1989) is a three-time Olympic champion Hungarian swimmer, who specializes in individual medley events. She is a nine-time long-course, and seventeen-time short-course world champion, and has broken 20 world records since 2013. || 
|-id=488
| 483488 Wudeshi ||  || Wu Deshi (born 1969) of Liuan, Anhui, is a Chinese meteorite hunter who founded the first private meteorite museum in China, the Wujuelin Meteorite Pavilion in Tibet; he has found 56 meteorites in the Xinjiang desert, and he writes and talks extensively about meteorites. || 
|}

483501–483600 

|-bgcolor=#f2f2f2
| colspan=4 align=center | 
|}

483601–483700 

|-bgcolor=#f2f2f2
| colspan=4 align=center | 
|}

483701–483800 

|-bgcolor=#f2f2f2
| colspan=4 align=center | 
|}

483801–483900 

|-bgcolor=#f2f2f2
| colspan=4 align=center | 
|}

483901–484000 

|-bgcolor=#f2f2f2
| colspan=4 align=center | 
|}

References 

483001-484000